N' My Neighborhood is the fifth studio album by American rapper MC Eiht, and his third solo album outside the Compton's Most Wanted brand. It was released on June 20, 2000 through Hoo-Bangin'/Priority Records, making it his sophomore and final album for the label. Production was handled by seven record producers, Young Tre, Caviar, DJ Raw Steele, DJ Slip, Overdose, Binky Mack of Allfrumtha I, and MC Eiht himself, with Hoo-Bangin' Records founder Mack 10 serving as executive producer. It features guest appearances from Mack 10, Soultre, Techniec, and CMW members.

The album peaked at number 95 on the Billboard 200 and at number 23 on the Top R&B/Hip-Hop Albums chart in the United States. It sold over 300,000 copies, which was great considering the album had little promotion.

Along with a single, a music video was produced for the song "Tha Hood Is Mine" featuring Mack 10 and Techniec. The video is set in the fashion of the movie Menace II Society, which co-starred MC Eiht.

Track listing

Charts

References

External links 

2000 albums
MC Eiht albums
Priority Records albums
Albums produced by MC Eiht